This is a list of notable people affiliated with Universiti Teknologi MARA.

Administration and faculty
 Emeritus Prof. Datuk Dr. Shad Saleem Faruqi, emeritus professor of law at the Faculty of Law
 Abdul Razak Abdul Hamid, created the Japanese language program for the Centre of Preparatory Education at Institute Teknologi Mara, the predecessor of the Universiti Teknologi MARA.
 Prof. Dato' Dr. Rahmat Mohamad, Secretary General of Asian-African Legal Consultative Organization (New Delhi, India)

Alumni

Law
 The Right Honourable Tan Sri Datuk Seri Panglima Richard Malanjum, the Chief Judge of the High Court in Sabah and Sarawak
 Puan Hasbi Hassan, Judge of the Kuala Lumpur Criminal Sessions Court
 Datuk Zaid Ibrahim, founder of the largest law firm in Malaysia, President of Parti Kesejahteraan Insan Tanah Air, former Senator, former Minister in the Prime Minister's Department and former member of the Central Leadership Council (Majlis Pimpinan Pusat), Parti Keadilan Rakyat.
 Yunalis Zarai, a Malaysian Indie singer
 Khairul Idzwan, a former practising lawyer and an avid blogger at kakijalans.com
 Dyana Sofya Mohd Daud, a DAP Candidate for Teluk Intan by-election, 2014, a former political secretary for prominent leader of the Democratic Action Party Lim Kit Siang, have own law firm at Cyberjaya

Public Administration
 Datuk Seri Azalina Othman Said, former Minister of Tourism, Malaysia , Minister in Prime Minister's Department
 Dato' Markiman Kobiran, Special Officer to the Minister of Home Affairs, former Malaysian Member of Parliament

Business
 Datuk Musa Aman, the Chief Minister for the state of Sabah
 Datuk Kamarudin Meranun, Chairman of AirAsia

Banking
 Yang Amat Mulia Permaisuri Siti Aishah binti Abdul Rahman, former Duli Yang Maha Mulia Raja Permaisuri Agong, the Queen of Malaysia

Communication and Media Studies
 Datuk Manja Ismail, editor for Berita Harian, a Malaysian daily newspaper
 Datuk Zakaria Wahab, former Press Secretary to Tun Dr. Mahathir Mohamed and BERNAMA correspondence in Singapore

Engineering
 Datuk Ir. Mohd. Zin Mohamed, former Malaysia's Works Minister 
 Mr. Azrulein Ibrahim, Malaysia's Lab Engineer and Designer 
 Tan Sri Dato' Sri Prof. Ir. Dr. Sahol Hamid Abu Bakar, Former Vice-Chancellor of Universiti Teknologi MARA (2009-2016)

References

Universiti Teknologi MARA